Tough Enough is a 1983 American romantic drama sports film directed by Richard Fleischer and starring Dennis Quaid, Pam Grier, Warren Oates (in his final film appearance) and Stan Shaw.

Plot synopsis
A down-on-his-luck country & western singer from Fort Worth enters a "toughman" competition to help pay his family's bills. Surprisingly, he does well against the other fighters and wins enough matches to qualify for a national championship. An unexpected break forces him to choose between his passion for his music career and his new-found success.

Cast
 Dennis Quaid as Art Long
 Warren Oates as James Neese
 Stan Shaw as Coolidge
 Pam Grier as Myra
 Carlene Watkins as Caroline
 Wilford Brimley as Bill Long
 Steve "Monk" Miller as Tigran Baldasarian
 Big John Hamilton as Big John
 Eli Cummings as Gay Bob
 2nd Detroit Referee Robert "Bobby" Watson

References

External links

1983 action films
1983 romantic drama films
1983 films
20th Century Fox films
American boxing films
American romantic drama films
Films shot in Texas
Films directed by Richard Fleischer
Films set in Fort Worth, Texas
1980s English-language films
1980s American films